Nadowli East is one of the constituencies represented in the Parliament of Ghana. It elects one Member of Parliament (MP) by the first past the post system of election. Nadowli East is located in the Nadowli district  of the Upper West Region of Ghana.

Boundaries
The seat is located within the Nadowli District of the Upper West Region of Ghana.

History 
This seat came into being prior to the  Ghanaian parliamentary election in 2004. This followed the altering of the Nadawli North and Nadawli South constituencies to the Nadawli East and Nadowli West constituencies respectively.

Members of Parliament

Elections

See also
List of Ghana Parliament constituencies

References 

Parliamentary constituencies in the Upper West Region